The Saint Marys Area School District is a midsized rural/suburban public school district serving parts of Elk County, Pennsylvania. It encompasses the city of St. Marys and the townships of Fox Township, Jay Township, and Benezette Township. According to 2000 federal census data, the District serves a resident population of 20,557. In 2009, the district residents’ per capita income was $18,669, while the median family income was $48,121. In the Commonwealth, the median family income was $49,501 and the United States median family income was $49,445, in 2010.

The district contains five schools: Fox Elementary, Bennett's Valley Elementary, South Elementary, Saint Marys Area Middle School, and Saint Marys Area High School.

References

School districts in Elk County, Pennsylvania
St. Marys, Pennsylvania